The "Shoeless" Joe Jackson Museum and Library was first opened to the public on June 21, 2008. Located across from Fluor Field in Greenville, South Carolina, the five room brick house in which Shoeless Joe Jackson lived and died in contains a few of his personal belongings and over 2,000 books related to baseball.

In 2015, the Shoeless Joe Jackson Museum formally petitioned Commissioner of Baseball Rob Manfred for Jackson's reinstatement to baseball, on grounds that Jackson had "more than served his sentence" in the 95 years since his banishment by Kenesaw Landis.  Manfred denied the request after an official review.  "The results of this work demonstrate to me that it is not possible now, over 95 years since those events took place and were considered by Commissioner Landis, to be certain enough of the truth to overrule Commissioner Landis' determinations," he wrote.

The museum allows members of the public to visit on Saturdays and conducts private tours during the week. While in Greenville, many visitors to the museum also visit "Shoeless" Joe Jackson's grave located in Woodlawn Memorial Park near the Bob Jones University campus. When visiting the grave, members of the public leave baseball related equipment such as baseballs, gloves, and cleats.

References

Buildings and structures in Greenville, South Carolina
Baseball museums and halls of fame
Museums established in 2008
2008 establishments in South Carolina
Museums in Greenville County, South Carolina
Sports museums in South Carolina